The International Association of Music Information Centres (IAMIC) (founded in 1986) is a worldwide network of organisations that document and promote contemporary music. IAMIC currently supports the work of 37 member organisations in 36 countries (2010).

Each of these 'Music Information Centres' promotes and documents the music of its own country of region over a variety of musical genres including contemporary classical music, world music, jazz and popular music. Its member organisations manage extensive resources (large libraries of sheet music, recordings, biographical and research materials) and deliver promotional and artistic projects (festivals, concerts, competitions, conferences) to the public.

While each member organisation focuses on the promotion of musical activities in their country or region, IAMIC works to promote international exchange on issues of common concern and brings these organisations together for collective projects.

References
www.iamic.net

International music organizations
Organizations established in 1986